Kielbasa myśliwska ('hunter's sausage') is a type of kielbasa (Polish sausage). Lightly smoked and dried, its ingredients are pork, salt, pepper, and juniper. At least one brand, made in Poland but sold in the UK, contains beef as well as pork.

As implied by the name this is a favourite of hunters, fishermen, and other outdoor workers. It is registered under the name "kiełbasa myśliwska staropolska" as a traditional meat product in Poland and a Traditional Speciality Guaranteed product in the European Union and the United Kingdom.

Gallery

See also
Kielbasa
List of sausages
Polish cuisine

Polish sausages

References